Josef Šusta is a Czech racing driver currently participating in the European Rallycross Championship, in the Super 1600 category.

Racing record

Complete FIA European Rallycross Championship results

Super1600

 Season still in progress.

References 

Living people
Czech rally drivers
Czech racing drivers
European Rallycross Championship drivers
Year of birth missing (living people)